The Kunstraum of Lüneburg University is an institution for contemporary art working across different faculties of Lüneburg University. Since its renaming in 2007 the complete name is Kunstraum of Leuphana University Lüneburg.

History 
In 1993 the Kunstraum has been founded by an interdisciplinary group of researchers, which is up to today in charge for the academic and artistic projects. Members of this group are:

 Art historian Beatrice von Bismarck (since 1999 at the Hochschule für Grafik und Buchkunst Leipzig)
 Mathematician Diethelm Stoller (retired since 2005)
 Sociologist Ulf Wuggenig (currently the acting director of Kunstraum)

The official opening in 1994 coincided with the project Services, which has been organized in collaboration with the art historian Helmut Draxler, at this time director of Kunstverein Munich, and the artist Andrea Fraser. The program of the subsequent years has been influenced and inspired by writings of Pierre Bourdieu, Nelson Goodman, Thomas S. Kuhn, and, amongst others, Howard S. Becker and included collaborations with artists and theoreticians accociated with Institutional Critique.

Exhibitions 
 1994: Services, with Andrea Fraser and Helmut Draxler
 1994: The Open Public Library in Hamburg, with Michael Clegg and Martin Guttmann
 1995: The Grandparents' Archives, with Christian Boltanski and Hans Ulrich Obrist
 1996: Import/Export Funk Office − Digital Transformation, with Renée Green
 1996: Public / Private, with Thomas Locher and Peter Zimmermann
 1997: Revisions of Abstract Expressionism, with Roger M. Buergel, Ruth Noack, Stefanie-Vera Kockot
 1997: Testoo® Muster, with Fabrice Hybert and Hans-Ulrich Obrist
 1998: The Campus as a Work of Art, with Christian Philipp Müller
 1999: Interarchive, with Hans-Peter Feldmann and Hans-Ulrich Obrist
 2000: Greenhouse, with Dan Peterman
 2001: Border Crossing Services, with Martin Krenn and Oliver Ressler
 2003: Vivre en POF, with Fabrice Hybert
 2004: The Government, with Roger M. Buergel and Ruth Noack
 2005: Economies of Misery. Pierre Bourdieu in Algeria, with Franz Schultheis and Christine Frisinghelli
 2006: Making Worlds <reformpause>, with Marion von Osten
 2007: "The Division of the World"- Tableaux on the Legal Synopses of the Berlin Africa Conference, with Dierk Schmidt
 2008: Moirés, with Astrid Wege
 2010: Conceptual Paradise − the studio of interest, with Stefan Römer
 2011: Demanding Supplies − Nachfragende Angebote, with Julia Moritz
 2013: Front, Field, Line, Plane, with Urban Subjects (Sabine Bitter, Jeff Derksen, Helmut Weber)
 2014: Art and its Frames – Continuity and Change, Symposium with Beatrice von Bismarck, Julia Bryan-Wilson, Helmut Draxler, Andrea Fraser, Renée Green, Hannes Loichinger, Sven Lütticken, John Miller, Marion von Osten, Gerald Raunig, André Rottmann, Stefan Römer, Simon Sheikh, and Ulf Wuggenig

Literature

External links 
 Official website of Kunstraums of University Lüneburg

References

Contemporary art galleries in Germany